Xrôshtag and Padvâxtag (Xrōštag and Padvāxtag) are a pair of Manichaean divinities, always depicted together, who serve as the personifications of the words "call" and "answer". The call is uttered from above by the "living spirit", and is answered from below by the man who wishes to be saved.

See also
Shilmai and Nidbai in Mandaeism
Adathan and Yadathan in Mandaeism
Shuqamuna and Shumaliya
List of angels in theology

References

Manichaeism
Deities and spirits
Pairs of angels